King Crimson Live in Mainz is a live album by the band King Crimson, released through the King Crimson Collectors' Club in March 2001.  The album was recorded at Eltzer Hof, Mainz, West Germany, on March 30, 1974.

Like other concerts from the European tour of early 1974, this show was recorded directly from the soundboard.  Four tracks ("The Savage", "Arabica", "Atria" and "Trio") were improvisations.  The liner notes were written by John Wetton in December 2000.

Track listing
"Improv: The Savage" (David Cross, Robert Fripp, John Wetton, Bill Bruford) – 2:12
"Doctor Diamond" (Cross, Fripp, Wetton, Bruford, Richard Palmer-James) – 5:48
"Improv: Arabica" (Cross, Fripp, Wetton, Bruford) – 2:29
"Exiles" (Cross, Fripp, Palmer-James) – 7:01
"Improv: Atria" (Cross, Fripp, Wetton, Bruford) – 6:14
"The Night Watch" (Fripp, Wetton, Palmer-James) – 5:07
"Starless" (Cross, Fripp, Wetton, Bruford, Palmer-James) – 12:27
"Lament" (Fripp, Wetton, Palmer-James) – 4:20
"Improv: Trio" (Cross, Fripp, Wetton, Bruford) – 4:36
"Easy Money" (Fripp, Wetton, Palmer-James) – 7:51

Personnel
David Cross – violin, Mellotron, electric piano
Robert Fripp – guitar, Mellotron, electric piano
John Wetton – bass guitar, vocals
Bill Bruford – drums, percussion

Produced by David Singleton and Alex R. Mundy

References

External links
 King Crimson - Live in Mainz 1974 (rel. 2001) album releases & credits at Discogs

2001 live albums
King Crimson Collector's Club albums